Legislative elections were held in Guinea-Bissau on 10 March 2019. They were originally scheduled for 18 November 2018 following an ECOWAS brokered agreement between President José Mário Vaz and the opposition in April 2018,  but the electoral census was not completed until 20 November, and Prime Minister Aristides Gomes subsequently proposed 16 December, 30 December, or 27 January 2019 as possible alternative dates. The election date was settled following a presidential decree issued in December 2018.

The African Party for the Independence of Guinea and Cape Verde (PAIGC) won 47 of the 102 seats and remained the largest party. Although its loss of ten seats resulted in a hung parliament, pre-election agreements with the Assembly of the People United (five seats), the New Democracy Party (one seat) and the Union for Change (one seat) gave the PAIGC-led coalition a six-seat majority in the National People's Assembly.

Electoral system
The 102 members of the National People's Assembly were elected by two methods; 100 by closed list proportional representation from 27 multi-member constituencies and two from single-member constituencies representing expatriate citizens in Africa and Europe.

Conduct
Election day was peaceful, with President Vaz stating "no-one has been killed, no fights, no coup, without random arrests and without political prisoners. Instead, there is freedom of expression and the right to assemble." Voter turnout was reportedly high.

Results

Aftermath
Following the elections, deputy President Domingos Simões Pereira of the PAIGC was initially proposed as the new Prime Minister. However, President Vaz refused to appoint him following a breakdown in relations between the two. The deadlock was finally lifted in late June 2019, when the incumbent Aristides Gomes was reappointed.

References

Elections in Guinea-Bissau
Guinea-Bissau
2019 in Guinea-Bissau